The TNT Tool (or Denver Tool as it was formerly known) is a multi-purpose tool used by firefighters, emergency personnel, and law enforcement officers to gain forcible entry to buildings, automobiles, etc. during emergency situations. It is a combination axe, sledgehammer, pry tool, ram, and D-handle pull tool. It is also carried by off-roaders and those traveling in remote areas.

See also
 Glossary of firefighting equipment
 Halligan bar
 K-tool

References

Firefighter tools

Video is no longer available from the posted Youtube link.